The 2022 West Dunbartonshire Council election was held on Thursday 5 May 2022, on the same day as the 31 other local authorities in Scotland. The election used the six wards created under the Local Governance (Scotland) Act 2004, with 22 councillors being elected. Each ward elected either 3 or 4 members, using the STV electoral system.

The SNP minority administration formed after the 2017 election was replaced with a new Labour majority administration.

2022 results

Ward results

Lomond
2017: 1xSNP; 1xLab; 1xCon
2022: 2xLab; 1xSNP
2017-2022 Change: Lab gain one seat from Con

Leven
2017: 2xSNP; 1xWDCP; 1xLab
2022: 2xLab; 1xSNP; 1xWDCP;
2017-2022 Change: Lab gain one from SNP

Dumbarton
2017: 2xSNP; 1xLab; 1xCon
2022: 2xLab; 2xSNP
2017-2022 Change: Lab gain one from Con

Kilpatrick
2017: 2xLab; 1xSNP
2022: 2xLab; 1xSNP
2017-2022 Change: no change

Clydebank Central
2017: 2xSNP; 1xLab; 1xIndependent
2022: 2xSNP; 2xLab
2017-2022 Change: Lab gain one seat from Independent

Clydebank Waterfront
2017: 2xSNP; 2xLab
2022: 2xSNP; 2xLab
2017-2022 Change: no change

Aftermath
Labour won twelve seats, giving them the majority they needed to regain control of the council from the SNP, who had won control in 2017. Martin Rooney was appointed Council Leader, with Michelle McGinty serving as his deputy.

Labour councillor Craig Edward was suspended from the party after being charged with possession of indecent images, and now sits as an Independent.

References

2022
West Dunbartonshire
21st century in West Dunbartonshire